Chris Penn (1965–2006) was an American actor.

Chris or Christopher Penn may also refer to:
Chris Penn (American football) (born 1971), former American football player
Chris Penn (cricketer) (born 1963), former English cricketer